August Heim (13 March 1904 – 8 May 1976) was a German fencer. He won two bronze medals at the 1936 Summer Olympics.

References

External links
 

1904 births
1976 deaths
German male fencers
Olympic fencers of Germany
Fencers at the 1928 Summer Olympics
Fencers at the 1936 Summer Olympics
Olympic bronze medalists for Germany
Olympic medalists in fencing
Medalists at the 1936 Summer Olympics
20th-century German people